The Traveller Adventure is a science fiction tabletop role-playing game adventure, written by Frank Chadwick, John Harshman, J. Andrew Keith, Marc W. Miller, and Loren Wiseman, with a cover by William H. Keith, for Traveller, published by Game Designers' Workshop in 1983. The Traveller Adventure follows the crew of a subsidized merchant vessel, the March Harrier, through a series of adventures in the Aramis subsector. It is the companion volume for The Traveller Book.

Reception
Craig Sheeley reviewed The Traveller Adventure in Space Gamer No. 70. Sheeley commented that "I was pleasantly surprised by The Traveller Adventure [...] it is reasonably price.  It is, on the whole, one of the best products ever made by GDW."

Stephen Nutt reviewed The Traveller Adventure for Imagine magazine, and stated that "I rate the Traveller adventure in the top five best role-playing products that have ever been placed on the market. In the context of Traveller it is the best thing GDW have ever produced, simply a must for anybody running a Traveller campaign."

Andy Slack reviewed The Traveller Adventure for White Dwarf #57, giving it an overall rating of 9 out of 10, and stated that "this is a superb campaign capable of entertaining a group of up to 8 players of any experience for up to a year."

Reviews
Different Worlds #36 (Sept./Oct., 1984)

See also
 Traveller publications

References

Role-playing game supplements introduced in 1983
Traveller (role-playing game) adventures